The Flint television relay station was an analogue television transmitter housed on a residential tower block called Bolingbroke Heights at the centre of the Town of Flint in North Wales. Flint is situated on the estuary of the River Dee which forms part the Wales border with England.

Between 1996 and 2009, the mast provided BBC One Wales and S4C to most of the town's residents. Its transmissions utilised spare UHF capacity in which to relay transmissions from the Moel-y-Parc transmitting station on low power (via another similar relay in nearby Bagillt). Due to limited capacity, it was not possible for the site to carry BBC Two Wales or ITV1 Wales. Owing to the constraints of local geography and location of the main Moel-y-Parc transmitter, residents in the town and some surrounding areas had previously been unable to fully access Welsh television output (provided in both the Welsh and English languages). Reception of the Welsh TV stations varied from poor to un-viewable and as a consequence programming was supplied almost exclusively by the North West of England-based TV stations such as ITV1 Granada, easily receivable with a set top aerial. As Flint falls outside the normal coverage area of these TV stations, reference in local programming was rarely ever made to the area. The relay was only installed following a campaign spearheaded by the Welsh-language group Teledu I Pawb. The group considered the bias toward North West of England regional TV programming across many parts of the North Wales coastal strip unacceptable and detrimental to the preservation and promotion of the Welsh Language, culture and national identity. Similar relays were installed at the same time in the nearby Village of Bagillt and the Town of Holywell. The latter also transmits BBC Radio Cymru. It is estimated that the three relays have made available Welsh regional TV programming to some 24,000 to 30,000 residents. A number of nearby localities remained without any terrestrial access to Welsh TV and radio output including Mostyn and Fynnongroyw. Viewers (and listeners) in these areas (and indeed across the UK) were, however, able to pick up all the Welsh TV and radio output via Sky satellite.

Situation at cessation of broadcasting

Cessation of broadcasting

After digital switchover, the mast ceased to relay television channels.

Welsh channels were instead transmitted from the Storeton transmitting station on the Wirral Peninsula.

References

External links
The Transmission Gallery: Photographs and Information of Flint television relay station)

Buildings and structures in Flintshire
Transmitter sites in Wales